Katri Marianne Ylander (born 17 December 1985) is a Finnish singer who rose to popularity after finishing second in Idols Finland 2, the Finnish version of Pop Idol. Ylander received 45% of votes, while the winner, Ilkka Jääskeläinen, received the other 55%.  She released her first album in June 2006, releasing a hit single soon afterwards, "Onko Vielä Aikaa?" ("Is there still time?"), which reached number one on the Finnish Radio Top 20 list in the week of 2 August.

Ylander was born in Harjavalta, Finland.

Discography

Albums

Singles

Idols Finland 2 Performances
Tampere Auditions: "Almaz" by Randy Crawford
Semi Finals: "Piste" by Stella
Top 7: "Saving All My Love for You" by Whitney Houston
Top 6: "The Final Countdown" by Europe
Top 5: "Kuurupiiloa" by Irina
Top 5: "Solitary Motions" by Emmi
Top 4: "Do You Know Where You're Going To?" by Diana Ross
Top 4: "Yes Sir, I Can Boogie" by Baccara
Top 3: "We Are" by Ana Johnsson
Top 3: "I'm with You" by Avril Lavigne
Top 3: "Älä Sano Mitään" by Irina
Grand Final: "Unohda En"
Grand Final: "Don't Speak" by No Doubt
Grand Final: "Piste" by Stella
Grand Final: "Total Eclipse of the Heart" by Bonnie Tyler

External links
MTV3 Biography
Findance.com

References

1985 births
Living people
21st-century Finnish women singers
People from Harjavalta
Idols (franchise) participants